Gummelt is a surname. Notable people with the surname include:

 Bernd Gummelt (born 1963), German race walker
 Beate Gummelt (born 1968), German race walker